The 1994 Toyota Atlantic Championship season was contested over 11 rounds. The Player's Toyota Atlantic Championship Drivers' Champion was David Empringham.

Races

Final driver standings (Top 12)

Final driver standings C2 Class (Top 3)

See also
1994 IndyCar season
1994 Indy Lights season

External links
ChampCarStats.com

Atlantic Championship 1994
Atlantic Championship seasons
1994 in motorsport
1994 in CART